Wind in the Bracken is a novel by F. J. Thwaites.

The story was adapted for radio in 1945 and 1954.

References

External links
Wind in the Bracken at AustLit

1941 Australian novels